Sasho Angelov (born 15 June 1969) is a Bulgarian  football manager and former player. Angelov played as a defender.

On the club level, Angelov played for Lokomotiv Gorna Oryahovitsa, Botev Plovdiv, CSKA Sofia, Lokomotiv Sofia, Dobrudzha Dobrich, Etar Veliko Tarnovo, Maltese Pietà Hotspurs and Albanian Flamurtari Vlorë. He finished out his career at the age of 33 years, playing for Akademik Svishtov in 2002.

During his playing career, he was capped eleven times for the Bulgarian national team.

Coaching career
On 29 June 2009, Sasho Angelov had been appointed as a manager of Botev Vratsa to replace Emil Marinov.

On 23 November 2016, Angelov returned as manager of Botev Vratsa, replacing Boyko Velichkov.

Personal life
His step-son Valeri Bojinov, also a footballer, made a vast career as а Bulgarian international, playing in Italy, England, Portugal, Serbia, China, Switzerland, and Croatia.

References

External links
 
 

Living people
1969 births
Bulgarian footballers
Bulgaria international footballers
FC Lokomotiv Gorna Oryahovitsa players
Botev Plovdiv players
PFC CSKA Sofia players
FC Lokomotiv 1929 Sofia players
PFC Dobrudzha Dobrich players
FC Etar Veliko Tarnovo players
Pietà Hotspurs F.C. players
PFC Akademik Svishtov players
First Professional Football League (Bulgaria) players
Bulgarian expatriate footballers
Expatriate footballers in Malta
Expatriate footballers in Albania
Bulgarian expatriate sportspeople in Albania
Bulgarian football managers
Bulgarian expatriate sportspeople in Malta
Association football defenders